The black jackrabbit (Lepus insularis) is a species of mammal in the family Leporidae. Endemic to Mexico, its only known location is Espiritu Santo Island in the Gulf of California.  The IUCN has listed this species as a "vulnerable species" because of its restricted range. This taxon is regarded by some authorities as being a subspecies of the black-tailed jackrabbit (L. californicus), found on the mainland of Mexico.

Description
The top of the head, upper surface of the body, and upper side of the tail are glossy black sheened with brown. The sides of the head, body, and limbs are dark cinnamon or buffy-brown and the underparts and underside of the tail are usually some lighter shade of brown. The eyes are surrounded by a ring of grey and the insides of the ears are greyish-black and fringed with long, grey hairs.

Habitat and ecology
The black jackrabbit is endemic to the Island of Espiritu Santo just off the coast of Baja California in Mexico. It is found on grassy and rocky slopes, plateaus, dunes, and valley bottoms, typically on bare slopes and among grasses, herbs, shrubs, and cacti.

The black jackrabbit is very conspicuous as its black colouring stands out against the browns, greys, and greens of its surroundings. It is closely related to the black-tailed jackrabbit on the Mexican mainland, but the latter species is exposed to terrestrial predators and does not display melanism. On the island, large predators are absent. The black jackrabbit shares its habitat with the Espíritu Santo antelope squirrel (Ammospermophilus insularis), the spiny pocket mouse (Chaetodipus spinatus), the cactus mouse (Peromyscus eremicus), the desert woodrat (Neotoma lepida), and the ring-tailed cat (Bassariscus astutus). Also present are a number of species of lizards and snakes and two predatory birds, the crested caracara (Caracara cheriway) and the American kestrel (Falco sparverius).

Status

Since the black jackrabbit is only found on the island of Espiritu Santo, its total range covers only , the area of the island. However, it is common over much of the island and the population appears to be stable. The chief threats it faces are from the introduction of non-native species and the disturbance of its habitat by humans, and the IUCN has rated its conservation status as being "near threatened". The island is uninhabited and is protected by the government of Mexico as part of the Área de Protección de Flora y Fauna: Islas del Golfo de California. It is a favoured ecotourism destination and in 1995 was declared to be part of a Biosphere Reserve, Islas del Golfo de California, by UNESCO.

References

Lepus
Endemic mammals of Mexico
Fauna of Gulf of California islands
Near threatened fauna of North America
Near threatened biota of Mexico
Mammals described in 1891
Taxonomy articles created by Polbot
Endemic fauna of the Baja California Peninsula